Conan the Destroyer is a 1984 film starring Arnold Schwarzenegger.

Conan the Destroyer may also refer to:

 Conan the Barbarian, the fictional character created by Robert E. Howard
 Conan the Destroyer (comics), comic book based on the film
 Conan the Destroyer (novel), novelization of the film by Robert Jordan
 Conan the Destroyer (painting), 1971 painting by Frank Frazetta

See also
 Conan (disambiguation)
 Conan the Adventurer (disambiguation)
 Conan the Barbarian (disambiguation)
 Conan the Cimmerian (disambiguation)
 Conan the Conqueror (disambiguation)

Disambiguation pages